Little Dunham is a village situated in the Breckland District of Norfolk and covers an area of 749 hectares (2.9 square miles) with a population of 309 at the 2001 census.
 
Little Dunham is served by the church of St Margaret in the Benefice of Great Dunham.

Great Dunham Primary School serves the village.

The unusual Fransham Obelisk raised in the memory of Lord Nelson is in Little Dunham.

Thomas Pell Platt, orientalist went to school in Little Dunham.

References

Villages in Norfolk
Breckland District
Civil parishes in Norfolk